Richard Wilhelm (1888 – 1917) was a German track and field athlete who competed in the 1908 Summer Olympics. In 1908 he was eliminated in the first round of the 3500 metre walk competition.

References

External links
list of German athletes

1888 births
1917 deaths
German male racewalkers
Olympic athletes of Germany
Athletes (track and field) at the 1908 Summer Olympics